Matthew J. Grow (born 1977) is an American historian specializing in Mormon history. Grow authored a biography of Thomas L. Kane, Liberty to the Downtrodden (2009), and co-authored a biography of Parley P. Pratt (2011), with Terryl Givens. 
He formerly directed the Center for Communal Studies housed at the University of Southern Indiana. As of 2012, Grow was the director of publications for the Church History Department of the Church of Jesus Christ of Latter-day Saints (LDS Church) and was among scholars preparing for publication of the Joseph Smith Papers.

In 2016, the Church Historian's Press released the book The First Fifty Years of Relief Society: Key Documents in Latter-day Saint Women's History, which was edited by Grow, Jill Mulvay Derr, Carol Cornwall Madsen, and Kate Holbrook. He also edited the book The Council of Fifty, Minutes, March 1844–January 1846, for the Church Historian's Press imprint of Deseret Book, 2016.

Grow also wrote the article "The Whore of Babylon and the Abomination of Abominations: Nineteenth-Century Catholic and Mormon Mutual Perceptions and Religious Identity".

In 2018, the LDS Church published Volume 1 of a new history of the church, entitled Saints with the first volume named The Standard of Truth. Grow was listed first among four general editors for the volume. In 2020, with the release of Saints Vol 2, No Unhallowed Hand Grow was again list first among the four general editors.

Grow has a bachelor's degree from Brigham Young University and a Ph.D. from the University of Notre Dame. During his graduate training, Grow did a summer seminar course in Latter-day Saint history that was directed by Richard L. Bushman.

Grow also serves as the historian for the Jared Pratt Family Association.

References

External links 
 

1977 births
21st-century American historians
American male non-fiction writers
American Latter Day Saint writers
Brigham Young University alumni
Historians of Utah
Historians of the Latter Day Saint movement
Latter Day Saints from Indiana
Latter Day Saints from Utah
Living people
Mormon studies scholars
University of Notre Dame alumni
University of Southern Indiana faculty
Writers from Salt Lake City
21st-century American male writers